Luxury Liner is a 1948 romantic musical comedy film produced by Metro-Goldwyn-Mayer in Technicolor. It was directed by Richard Whorf, and written by Richard Connell, Gladys Lehman and Karl Kamb (uncredited). It was originally titled Maiden Voyage.

An earlier film with the same title Luxury Liner (1933), starred George Brent and Zita Johann, and was directed by Lothar Mendes.

Plot
Jeremy Bradford, the   captain of an ocean liner, visits his teenaged daughter named Polly, and  takes her to see a performance of the opera Aida. Polly is entranced by the singing talents of Olaf Eriksen and Zita Romanka.

Upon learning that Olaf and Zita will be passengers on her father's voyage to Rio de Janeiro, she begs her father to come along, but Captain Bradford says no. He is furious when he eventually discovers that Polly is on board his ship as a stowaway, and he puts her to work in the ship's galley.

Also on board is Laura Dene, a jilted bride,  and her fiancé Charles, who can't decide if he wants to marry her. Polly and  Laura become friends, though Laura isn't aware at first that Polly is the captain's daughter. Captain Bradford forgives Polly for stowing away, and he allows her to sing a duet with Olaf aboard ship. Polly is equally pleased when her father develops a romantic interest in Laura, which turns out to be mutual.

Cast
 George Brent as  Captain Jeremy Bradford
 Jane Powell as  Polly Bradford
 Lauritz Melchior as  Olaf Eriksen
 Frances Gifford as  Laura Dene
 Marina Koshetz as  Zita Romanka
 Xavier Cugat as himself
 Thomas E. Breen as  Denis Mulvy
 Richard Derr as  Charles G.K. Worton
 John Ridgely as Chief Officer Carver
 Connie Gilchrist as Bertha
 The Pied Pipers as Themselves
 Jane Isbell as Girl (uncredited)

Reception
The film was a box-office hit for MGM, and earned $2,297,000 in the U.S. and Canada and $1,831,000 overseas, resulting in a profit of $428,000.

References

External links
 
 
 
 
 

1948 films
American romantic comedy films
Films directed by Richard Whorf
Metro-Goldwyn-Mayer films
1948 romantic comedy films
1948 musical comedy films
American romantic musical films
Films produced by Joe Pasternak
Films scored by Adolph Deutsch
Films set on ships
1940s romantic musical films
American musical comedy films
1940s American films